Stalix is a genus of jawfishes native to the Indian Ocean and the western Pacific Ocean.

Species
There are currently 12 recognized species in this genus:
 Stalix davidsheni Klausewitz, 1985
 Stalix dicra Smith-Vaniz, 1989 (Forked jawfish)
 Stalix eremia Smith-Vaniz, 1989 (Solitary jawfish)
 Stalix flavida Smith-Vaniz, 1989
 Stalix histrio D. S. Jordan & Snyder, 1902 (Harlequin jawfish)
 Stalix immaculata C. Y. Xu & H. Z. Zhan, 1980
 Stalix moenensis (Popta, 1922) (Muna jawfish)
 Stalix novikovi Prokofiev, 2015  
 Stalix omanensis Norman, 1939 (Oman jawfish)
 Stalix sheni Smith-Vaniz, 1989
 Stalix toyoshio Shinohara, 1999
 Stalix versluysi (M. C. W. Weber, 1913) (Versluys' jawfish)

References

Opistognathidae
Taxa named by David Starr Jordan
Taxa named by John Otterbein Snyder